is a passenger railway station located in the town of Kumenan, Kume District, Okayama Prefecture, Japan, operated by West Japan Railway Company (JR West).

Lines

Station layout
The station consists of two ground-level opposed side platforms. The station building is owned by Kumenan Town is located on the side of Platform 2, and is connected to Platform 1 by a footbridge. The station is staffed.

Platforms

Adjacent stations

History
Yuge Station opened on December 21, 1898 with the opening of the Tsuyama Line.  With the privatization of the Japan National Railways (JNR) on April 1, 1987, the station came under the aegis of the West Japan Railway Company.

Passenger statistics
In fiscal 2019, the station was used by an average of 196 passengers daily..

Surrounding area
 Kumenan Town Hall
 Kumenan Municipal Kumenan Junior High School
 Japan National Route 53.

See also
List of railway stations in Japan

References

External links

 Yuge Station Official Site

Railway stations in Okayama Prefecture
Tsuyama Line
Railway stations in Japan opened in 1898
Kumenan, Okayama